The Military ranks of the Kingdom of Italy were the military insignia used by the Italian Armed Forces when Italy was the Kingdom of Italy (1861–1946). During the World Wars, the Carabinieri, as the then-most senior corps of the Army, wore similar insignia to those used by the rest of the service.

Royal Italian Army

Commissioned officer ranks 
The rank insignia of commissioned officers.

Other ranks 
The rank insignia of non-commissioned officers and enlisted personnel.

Royal Italian Navy

Commissioned officer ranks 
The rank insignia of commissioned officers.

Other ranks
The rank insignia of non-commissioned officers and enlisted personnel.

Royal Italian Air Force

Commissioned officer ranks 
The rank insignia of commissioned officers.

Other ranks 
The rank insignia of non-commissioned officers and enlisted personnel.

Blackshirts

Commissioned officer ranks 
The rank insignia of commissioned officers.

Other ranks 
The rank insignia of non-commissioned officers and enlisted personnel.

Notes

References 
Citations

Bibliography

 
 
 
 
 

1861 establishments in Italy
1946 disestablishments in Italy
Royal Italian Army
Italy, Kingdom
Regia Marina